Alan Shoulder (born 4 February 1953) is an English football manager and former player. A striker, he began his career with Leeholme Juniors, before joining Bishop Auckland in 1972. In 1977, he joined Blyth Spartans and featured in their run to the fifth round of the FA Cup. In December 1978, he was transferred to Newcastle United for £20,000, where he scored 38 goals in 117 games. In 1982, he joined Carlisle United on a free transfer, then in 1985 joined Hartlepool United, again on a free transfer. An eye injury forced him to retire as a professional player in December 1988, but he continued playing with Ferryhill Athletic. He later became assistant manager at Gretna, and then a coach at Newcastle Blue Star. He has since managed several clubs, including Coundon, Crook Town, Bishop Auckland, Willington, West Auckland Town and Blyth Spartans.

References 

1953 births
Living people
Sportspeople from Bishop Auckland
Footballers from County Durham
English footballers
Association football forwards
Bishop Auckland F.C. players
Blyth Spartans A.F.C. players
Newcastle United F.C. players
Carlisle United F.C. players
Hartlepool United F.C. players
Ferryhill Athletic F.C. players
English Football League players
English football managers
Crook Town A.F.C. managers
Gateshead F.C. managers
Blyth Spartans A.F.C. managers
Bishop Auckland F.C. managers
Willington A.F.C. players
West Auckland Town F.C. managers